Othello is a 1995 drama film based on William Shakespeare's tragedy of the same name. It was directed by Oliver Parker and stars Laurence Fishburne as Othello, Irène Jacob as Desdemona, and Kenneth Branagh as Iago. This is the first cinematic reproduction of the play released by a major studio that casts an African American actor to play the role of Othello, although low-budget independent films of the play starring Ted Lange and Yaphet Kotto predated it.

Plot
Othello, a Moor who has secretly married his native Venetian lover Desdemona, is assigned to fight against a Turkish invasion attempt on the island of Cyprus. During the battle, he was accompanied by his faithful lieutenant, Cassio. When Othello finally arrives at Cyprus, however, the Turkish invasion fleet has been wrecked by a storm, and, reunited with Desdemona, who had volunteered herself to go with him, leads his men and the people of Cyprus in a celebration.

Iago, Othello's trusted companion and ensign, envies Othello's prosperous life and Cassio's lieutenancy and, convinced that both of them had slept with his own wife, Emilia, plans to ruin both by manipulating Othello into believing that Desdemona is having an affair with Cassio and is pregnant with Cassio's child. He arouses Othello's suspicion and jealousy gradually and then plants Desdemona's handkerchief in Cassio's clothing for Othello to find. When he does, he is convinced of Desdemona's infidelity and, in a rage, decides to kill both her and Cassio.

Othello smothers Desdemona, who dies just as Emilia enters the bedroom. Emilia then tells Othello the truth behind Iago's lies and he realizes what he has done. The authorities and Othello turn on Iago, and, after a running fight, capture and beat him. In despair, Othello stabs and wounds Iago. Othello then kills himself, and Iago is taken away to be tortured and executed.

Cast
Laurence Fishburne as Othello
Irène Jacob as Desdemona
Kenneth Branagh as  Iago
Nathaniel Parker as Cassio
Michael Maloney as Roderigo
 Anna Patrick as Emilia
Nicholas Farrell as Montano
Indra Ové as Bianca
Michael Sheen as Lodovico

Reception
The film received largely positive reviews, especially for Branagh's Iago. Branagh was nominated for a Screen Actors Guild Award for his performance. Janet Maslin of The New York Times wrote: "Mr. Branagh's superb performance, as the man whose Machiavellian scheming guides the story of Othello's downfall, guarantees this film an immediacy that any audience will understand. ... Mr. Fishburne's performance has a dangerous edge that ultimately works to its advantage, and he smolders movingly through the most anguished parts of the role. ... Anna Patrick is particularly transfixing in the role of Emilia, Iago's wife and Desdemona's servant, who scathingly articulates some of the play's feminist undercurrents."

As of May 2022, the film holds a rating of 68% on Rotten Tomatoes based on 40 reviews with the consensus: "Perhaps less than the sum of its parts, Othello is still highly entertaining and features excellent performances from Laurence Fishburne and Kenneth Branagh."

References

External links

1995 films
Films based on Othello
1995 drama films
American drama films
1990s English-language films
Films about interracial romance
Films set in the 16th century
Films set in Venice
Films set in Cyprus
Castle Rock Entertainment films
Columbia Pictures films
Films directed by Oliver Parker
Films shot in Italy
British drama films
Films produced by David Barron
1995 directorial debut films
1990s American films
1990s British films